This is a list of women artists who were born in Jamaica or whose artworks are closely associated with that country.

A
Pearl Alcock (1934–2006), outsider artist
Esther Anderson (born 1946), filmmaker, photographer, actress

B
Jacqueline Bishop, writer, visual artist and photographer
Hope Brooks (born 1944), painter

C
Margaret Chen (born 1951), sculptor
Renée Cox (born 1960), artist, photographer, curator, feminist, now in New York

E
Gloria Escoffery (1923–2002), painter, poet, critic

F
Elsie Few (1909–1980), painter, art teacher

G
Marguerite Primrose Gerrard (1922–1993), botanical artist
Lorna Goodison (born 1947), writer and painter

M
Tamara Natalie Madden (active since 2001), mixed-media artist, now in the United States
Edna Manley (1900–1987), sculptor
Petrona Morrison (born 1954), sculptor

P
Ebony Patterson (born 1981), mixed-media artist

-
Jamaican
Artists
Artists, women